Ametris is a genus of moths in the family Geometridae.

Species
 Ametris monilaria (Fabricius, 1776)
 Ametris nitocris (Cramer, 1780) – seagrape spanworm moth

References
 Ametris at Markku Savela's Lepidoptera and some other life forms

Oenochrominae
Geometridae genera